Transporte Urbano Comarcal (abbreviated: TUC, meaning: 'Comarcal Urban Transportation System') is a regional public transportation system operating in the city of Iruña/Pamplona.

EHG/TUC is the only transit bus provider for Iruña/Pamplona and surroundings, owned by the Iruñerriko Mankomunitatea/Mancomunidad de la Comarca de Pamplona, and operated by Transports Ciutat Comtal. However, there are coach bus services, owned by the Government of Navarre and operated by different operators, connecting Iruña/Pamplona to the rest of Navarre and to other autonomous communities.

EHG/TUC is, with Bilbobus (Bilbo city), the best transportation system in Spain regarding punctuality, information reliability and vehicle occupation levels. Furthermore, the network has been given a score of 7.8 out of 10 in user satisfaction. It also owns the longest electric transit bus line on the Iberian Peninsula, line 9.

EHG/TUC buses are white, with yellow and green motifs and are commonly called Villavesas or Billabesak, which confuses people from outside of Navarre because they do not know what the local speakers refer to. The name comes from La Villavesa SA, the first transit bus company in Iruñerria, from 1920 to 1969.

Data

Service fleet

Day lines 
These are the 24 lines in service mainly between 06:00 and 22:00, every day of the week. However, some of them deviate slightly from these times, and others are only active at certain times. They are considered the reference lines of EHG/TUC.

Night lines 
These are the ten lines ensuring service mainly between 22:00 and, depending on the day, 23:00, 02:00 or 04:00.

Projects

(Tram for Pamplona) 
The  (Pamplona tram project) was a project run between 2005 and 2008, involving the creation of up to three tram lines in the city of Iruña/Pamplona.

The Government of Navarre concluded, after studying different possibilities, that implementing this project would have a very good impact on the city. However, the government estimated the cost at more than 700 million euros, and finally discarded the project.

As an alternative, Iruñerriko Mankomunitatea created bus lanes on the city's biggest avenues.

(Rapid System) 
After the Pamplona Tram Project, two options were suggested: create bus rapid transit (BRT) system or a transit bus optimized system. Iruñerriko Mankomunitatea decided to develop the first idea, combining it with the Pamplona Tram Project concept, where more lines can be created (up to five in the first phase) and the other buses can use the same reserved platform.

The new system will be accompanied by a total change of the current bus lines and it will be operating before 2024.

BRT (in Spanish, BTR) lines will run 98% of their route on a separate, independent platform. Buses, 33 estimated in the first phase, will be 100% electric, but since there will be no catenary, it will be stored in batteries that will be recharged after each trip.

In folklore
The  ("running of the town bus") started in Pamplona on 15th July 1984 when, after the end of the Sanfermines festival and its associated running of the bulls, youths would run before the earliest urban bus entering the traditional  course.
Starting in 1990, the Pamplona bus company detoured the early bus  to defuse the risk.
Currently, the youths run before a cyclist in a yellow jersey as an homage to the Navarrese cycling champion Miguel Induráin.

Images

References

External links 

 EHG/TUC official website
 Iruñerriko Mankomunitatea official website

Pamplona